Detlev Traut (born 29 June 1955) is a South African cricketer. He played in one List A and eight first-class matches for Boland from 1980/81 to 1984/85.

See also
 List of Boland representative cricketers

References

External links
 

1955 births
Living people
South African cricketers
Boland cricketers
Sportspeople from Malmesbury